Ugao-Miraballes (official and Basque language name; informally in Spanish: Miravalles) is a town and municipality in the province of Biscay and autonomous community of the Basque Country in northern Spain.

External links
 Ugao-Miraballes in the Bernardo Estornés Lasa - Auñamendi Encyclopedia

References

Municipalities in Biscay